The Tummel hydro-electric power scheme is an interconnected network of dams, power stations, aqueducts and electric power transmission in the Grampian Mountains of Scotland. Water, depending on where it originates and the path it takes, may pass through as many as five of the schemes nine power stations as it progresses from north-west to south-east. The scheme was constructed in the 1940s and 50s incorporating some earlier sites. It is currently managed by SSE plc.

Early Development 
The idea of Loch Ericht as a source for hydro-electric power was first anticipated in 1899, when the Highland Water Power Bill was put before Parliament. The plan was to generate electricity of industrial purposes, but the bill did not receive Parliamentary approval. The next attempt was the Loch Ericht Water and Electricity Power Act, which received approval in 1912, but it included a clause that prohibited alteration of the water level of the loch, making the scheme uneconomic. Dundee Corporation sought to use Loch Ericht, Loch Rannoch and Loch Tummel in a scheme proposed in 1919, but there was strong opposition to it, and the plans did not come to fruition.

The potential for hydro-electric power in the Highlands of Scotland was recognised by the Snell Committee, who published reports in 1919 and 1920. Against this background, the Grampian Electricity Supply Bill was laid before Parliament. The promotors were aware of the "fundamental principles" set out by the Snell Committee, and ensured that these formed part of the bill. Consequently, the scheme would treat a single catchment area comprehensively, and would ensure that some of the power generated would be made available to residents who lived within the catchment of the scheme. The promotors included the Duke of Atholl and the chairman of Lloyds Bank, John William Beaumont Pease, both men who were known to be honest and trustworthy, and who were held in high regard locally. The bill became an Act of Parliament in 1922, and allowed the promotors to use the waters of Loch Ericht, Loch Rannoch and Loch Tummel. Some of the power would be sold in bulk to the Scottish Central Electric Power Company and the Fife Electric Power Co.

Grampian Electricity Company
The newly formed Grampian Electricity Supply Company failed to raise the £1.75 million of authorised capital, and asked George Balfour for help. Balfour, with Andrew Beatty, had formed the engineering company Balfour Beatty in 1907, and in October 1922 this had been restructured so that Power Securities Corporation Ltd bought the share capital of Balfour Beatty and a number of utility companies for which they had provided engineering or management expertise. Power Securities was created specifically to provide funding for capital intensive schemes, and despite the deep depression of late 1922, were able to help. They bought the Grampian company, which was passed to the Scottish Power Company Limited, the Scottish arm of the new organisation, and Balfour Beatty became its engineers and managers. They realised that the scheme could only be economic if some of the power generated was exported to the industrial heartland of central Scotland, as their own area was too sparsely populated. Indeed, the newly-formed Central Electricity Board rejected the idea of extending the national grid into the Grampian area, because of its low demand for power. However, in June 1927 they had agreed to buy bulk electricity from the Grampian company via a link to the national grid at Abernethy and Balfour was ready to proceed with the Grampian scheme.

Some ingenuity was required to make the scheme work efficiently under all conditions. The solution adopted was to use a power station on the River Tummel below Loch Rannoch to provide most of the power under flood conditions, and to store water in Loch Ericht. When there was less water available, most of the power would come from a power station on the banks of Loch Rannoch, fed with water from Loch Ericht, and Loch Rannoch would be used to store water. Accordingly, Rannoch power station had a capacity of 48 MW and Tummel power station had a capacity of 34 MW.

The scheme was split into two phases, with work on the first beginning in 1928. Several smaller projects supplemented the flow into Loch Ericht by diverting the headwaters of the River Truim, the Allt Ghlas, and other streams. This phase was completed in November 1930. A dam was also constructed at the northern end of Loch Ericht close to the village of Dalwhinnie to contain the raised water level, and prevent it from discharging into the River Truim and flooding Dalwhinnie. The dam has a concrete core with earth embankments on the upstream and downstream faces.

The growing need for electricity in the central belt of Scotland meant that the scheme was able to supply 12 MW to the Central Electricity Board, and when the sale of bulk electricity was doubled to 24 MW in late 1930, the Grampian Board had the resources to extend their network to some of the more remote parts of their authorised area, and to press on with the second phase of the scheme. This was the Tummel development, on which work started in Spring 1931. A control weir was built at the outlet to Loch Rannoch, and the river channel below that was made deeper. Rannoch and Tummel power stations were notable for being the first storage high-head stations, where water is held in a reservoir above the power station, rather than simply relying on water passing as part of the run of the river as had previously been done in Scotland.

Infrasructure
Water from the surrounding hills collects in Loch Ericht. This resulted in approximately 78,050 acre feet (96,277,000m3) of water storage. At the time Rannoch was fitted with two 22,000 hp (16,500 kW) water turbines with provision for a third.

From there an open aqueduct carries the water the remaining  to Tummel where a head of  powers two 24,000 hp (18,000 kW) horizontal generators, with the electricity generated connected into the same transmission line as Rannoch. The discharge water then rejoined the river Tummel for  before entering Loch Tummel.

The various works were designed and built by Balfour Beatty with consultant engineer William Halcrow. Subsequently, both Tummel and Rannoch power stations have become Category A listed buildings, being designed in "a simple classical style and with a bold outline."

Main Scheme

Background 
In the early 1940s various schemes were proposed for electricity development across Scotland and the nationalised North of Scotland Hydro-Electric Board was established in 1943 to undertake some of them. The schemes, including the then named Tummel-Garry Scheme, were not universally welcomed. At the time the Tummel-Garry scheme was introduced, only 1 in 6 farms and 1 in 200 crofts in Perthshire had electric power. The concerted opposition to the Board's plans resulted in the resignation of the first chair of the board Lord Airlie, and Tom Johnston was appointed to run the board in 1946.  His tenure lasted until 1959 and he successfully completed many projects by pushing an agenda of social change through development.

There had been concerted opposition to the Board's first scheme, that at Loch Sloy, but when the Tummel Garry scheme was published as the second scheme to be implemented, the Secretary of State, Tom Johnston received 25 objections. Johnston therefore set up a tribunal to consider the application, overseen by John Cameron, Sir Robert Bryce Walker and Major G H M Brown Lindsay. The hearing lasted for ten days, and the transcripts ran to 1,188 pages. Opposition was spearheaded by Perthshire County Council, a number of riparian landowners and the residents of Pitlochry. There were claims that the amenity of the area would be destroyed, tourists would no longer come to the area, and that salmon fishing would no longer be possible. Edward MacColl, the Board's Chief Executive, was unable to appear as he was ill, and Lord Airlie was a less able witness, who had suffered months of vicious abuse in the press. However, he recovered his composure on the second day, and emphasised that the scheme would benefit much of the North of Scotland and the Islands.

From day six, fishery experts, civil engineers, architects, hotel owners, youth hostelers and environmentalists argued the case for the opposition. There were calls for the Board to develop schemes elsewhere, such as Affric, or the more remote parts of the Highlands. The allegations were acrimonious, but R P Morison, summing up for the Board at the end of the proceedings, stated that the benefits of providing electricity to remote areas where it would be uneconomic to do so without such a scheme outweighed the small amount of damage that might be done, and he was adamant that the tourists would still come to Pitlochry and that the livelihoods of the residents would be maintained. The final report, when it was published, largely agreed with this position, and recommended that the scheme should proceed. There were attempts to derail the progress of the bill in Parliament, which raised the same issues again, but the MP for Perth and Kinross, William Snadden, failed to convince the House of Commons that the confirmation order should be annulled, and Lord Kinnaird was persuaded not to bring a similar motion in the House of Lords.
   
Edinburgh based architect Harold Tarbolton of Tarbolton & Ochterlony was part of the NoSHEB architectural panel, along with Reginald Fairlie and James Shearer. The panel was responsible for much of the design of the later scheme's structures several of which are now listed. Listings include Pitlochry which is Category A (defined as "Buildings of special architectural or historical interest which are outstanding examples of a particular period, style or building type.") and is described by Historic Environment Scotland as "an outstanding example...a bold modernist design by Harold Tarbolton."

Sir Edward MacColl was the board's engineer having previously been responsible for other hydro schemes. The contracting engineers were Sir Alexander Gibb and Partners and around 12,000 workers were employed at the peak of construction with workers including German and Italian former prisoners of war as well as a cohort of Donegal Tunnel Tigers, Irish tunnelling specialists who moved from job to job.

The scheme was expected to generate 635 Gigawatt-hours a year, and by 1986 it had achieved an average of 663 GWh a year.

Water route 
The 'green energy trail' map shows the completed scheme as offering four main water paths all of which ultimately arrive into Loch Tummel to feed the Clunie and Pitlochry stations.  From the north the highest storage point in the scheme is at Loch an t Seilich (427 m above sea level). Water passes through a tunnel to Loch Cuaich at 397m to feed the Cuaich station discharging into the north-east end of Loch Ericht at 359 m.

Alternatively water from Loch Garry at 415m feeds west through a tunnel to Ericht power station to also join Loch Erich. The combined water, along with Ericht's own catchment, then feeds to Rannoch and onto Tummel as per the 1930s scheme.

From the west water from Rannoch Moor is impounded at Loch Eigheach on the River Gaur to feed Gaur power station before discharging along the river and into Loch Rannoch to join the Ericht feed as well as Loch Rannoch's catchment.

In the centre of the system water from the River Bruar and River Garry is fed to storage at Loch Errochty at 329 m.  Here it feeds directly to Errochty power station discharging into the mouth of the River Tummel.  Some bypass water, used to maintain a small river known as the Errochty Water, is used to generate power at Trinafour.

Regardless of path the water arrives at Loch Tummel where it is impounded by the Clunie Dam located in a narrow valley at the eastern end of the loch. Water then passes through Clunie station to Loch Faskally which feeds the Pitlochry station.

The scheme power stations are generally, though not exclusively, named for their physical location as opposed to their feedstock.  For example; Loch Ericht station is fed from Loch Garry but is adjacent to, and discharges into, Loch Ericht. A notable exception is Errochty power station, which discharges into Loch Tummel. It is also known as Tummel Bridge to distinguish it from the nearby, pre-existing Tummel station.

Ecological Impact 
The scheme made many changes to the natural water courses across the region. Many of the schemes rivers and lochs are categorised as Heavily Modified Water Bodies (defined as a body of surface water which, as a result of physical alterations by human activity, is substantially changed in character.)  Near the highest point in the scheme the upper River Garry was completely dry for a distance of 20 kilometres from the 1950s until a project in 2017 returned some water, around 1 cubic meter a second, to the section. Other associated changes included the removal of a weir at Struan to allow fish to pass up the river.

The scheme has nine named dams and one weir.  The 1930 dam at Ericht (for Rannoch) appears to have been extended as part of the later scheme.     
   
Listed by SSE as main dams are: Gaur, Errochty, Clunie and Pitlochry. Other dams are at Ericht, Dalwhinne, Dunalastair, Cuaich, and Tromie (Lochan-t-Seilich). A significant weir at Kinloch Rannoch is also part of the scheme.

References

 Department of Trade and Industry statistics

Bibliography

External links

Tummel hydro-electric scheme information
Map of the scheme on page 19

Buildings and structures in Perth and Kinross
Hydroelectric power stations in Scotland